Yonsky is the rural locality (a Posyolok) in Kovdor municipality of Murmansk Oblast, Russia. The village is located beyond the Arctic circle. Located at a height of 142 m above sea level.

References

Rural localities in Murmansk Oblast